Prokoeneniidae is a family of microscorpions in the order Palpigradi. There are at least two genera and about seven described species in Prokoeneniidae.

Genera
 Prokoenenia Borner, 1901
 Triadokoenenia Condé, 1991

References

Further reading

 
 
 

Palpigradi
Arachnid families